Samir Abu Eisheh (born 1960) is the former Planning Minister of the Palestinian National Authority (PNA). He served in the Palestinian Tenth Government and Eleventh (National Unity) Government (2006–2007) as an expert in planning. He graduated from the Pennsylvania State University with a PhD in civil engineering. Abu Eisheh also served as a consultant to several Palestinian institutions including the Planning Ministry as well as several other institutions locally and internationally before being the Minister of Planning. He also spent some time as a visiting professor in a number of US and European universities. He is the publisher of more than seventy research studies and articles on civil engineering and planning.

References 

Living people
Finance ministers of the Palestinian National Authority
Government ministers of the Palestinian National Authority
1960 births
Hamas members
Palestinian politicians